Government City College (Autonomous), Hyderabad is an Under Graduate and Post-Graduate autonomous college located in Hyderabad. The campus is one of the oldest Heritage structures in Hyderabad. Government City College has been re-accredited with 'B++' grade by National Assessment and Accreditation Council. It has been conferred with autonomy by the University Grants Commission, Osmania University and the Telangana State Government since 2004. The college has adopted CBCS since the academic year 2014-15.

History
The Nizam Mahbub Ali Khan, Asaf Jah VI of Hyderabad established the first city school in the name "Madarsa Dar-ul-uloom" as early as 1865, later Nizam Osman Ali Khan, Asaf Jah VII, converted it into a City High School. The school moved into the present grand building in 1921. Intermediate sections (F.A) of Osmania University with 30 students were introduced in 1921 under the supervision of the high school with Urdu as the medium of instruction. In 1929, the school was upgraded to a college and was named as "City College". It became a constituent college of Osmania University. Its chief engineer was Nawab Khan Bahadur Mirza Akbar Baig.

Syllabus and changes of name
Consequent to the abolition of the Intermediate course (FA) in Osmania University in 1956, the Pre-University Course (PUC) was introduced. The Bachelor of Science courses were introduced in 1962 and the institution was named as "City Science College". City College was taken over by the government from Osmania University in 1965 and was renamed as Government City Science College. In 1967, B.A and B.Com courses were added and the college became "Government City College". The college offers more than 50 undergraduate programmes, including B.Sc, B.A., B.Com and BBA.

Post Graduate Research Centre
The college was upgraded as a Research Center with the introduction of Master of Science Programs in Biotechnology, and Mathematics, in 2001 and 2003 respectively with 100% placement record. Physics, and Commerce were introduced in 2015 and 2016 respectively.

Facilities and activities
 Central library which possesses rare books, Central Computing and Internet facilities.
 Cricket/football stadium, NCC and NSS.
 Health Centre, grievances redressal cell, career guidance cell.
 B.R. Ambedkar Open University center, auditorium and Seminar Hall.
 State of the art Biotechnology lab, and field visits to Genome Valley.

Architecture
Government City College was established in 1919 during the rule of the Nizam, Osman Ali Khan, Asaf Jah VII of erstwhile Hyderabad State. The campus is spread over 16 acres and the building is constructed on the banks of Musi River in the Indo-Saracenic style facing the open ground (now Quli Qutub Shah Stadium) and the Telangana High Court is adjacent to the college. The College building has been declared as a Heritage Monument by the Government of Telangana, It has been a pan-India film shooting hub.

Notable alumni
 Shivraj Patil
 P. Shiv Shankar
 Marri Chenna Reddy
Arshad Ayub
 M. Prabhakar Reddy
 Paruchuri Gopala Krishna
 J. K. Bharavi
 Muhammad Ali (actor)

References

See also

Osmania University , Hyderabad

Universities and colleges in Hyderabad, India
Heritage structures in Hyderabad, India
Establishments in Hyderabad State
1921 establishments in India
Educational institutions established in 1921